Daniel Warner Forden (born September 28, 1963) is an American sound programmer and music composer. He has worked on video games developed by Midway and its successor NetherRealm Studios since 1989. Forden achieved recognition for his audio work on the Mortal Kombat fighting game series where he was part of the original design team. He is also recognized for his Easter egg appearances in the series. Outside of video games, Forden played bass guitar in the progressive rock band Cheer-Accident from 1992 to 1993.

Biography and working style
Forden was born in Chicago, Illinois. He is the youngest of their four children to Sara Forden (née Mazza) and Michael Forden.

Forden is a graduate of the Oberlin Conservatory of Music in the TIMARA program (or Technology in Music and Related Arts). He graduated in 1985 from the Conservatory and has since produced sounds for many Williams Electronics games. Forden's musical style, particularly for the Mortal Kombat series, is often a mixture of synthetic and organic sounds. A typical composition usually incorporates ethnic drumming with synthetic basses, synthetic leads and/or pads, and sometimes exotic instruments.

In the Mortal Kombat series, he is credited as Dan "Toasty" Forden. The nickname derives from an Easter egg that first appeared in Mortal Kombat II, where Forden's head would appear in the bottom-right corner of the screen and shout "Toasty!" in a falsetto when an uppercut was performed. After being retained for Mortal Kombat 3, the Easter egg would not be used again until the 2011 reboot. It also appears in the "Tournament" stage of Mortal Kombat 11, using the Mortal Kombat 3 graphic of Forden. The "Toasty!" sound effect would be featured frequently in the series after its introduction, often in reference to fatalities performed by Scorpion.

Two additional Easter eggs were created featuring Forden in Mortal Kombat 3 and Ultimate Mortal Kombat 3; freezing an opponent in "danger mode" with Sub-Zero would make him shout "Frosty!" and both players holding down the "High Punch" button after a Stage Fatality in Scorpion's Lair would make him shout "Crispy!"

Forden also included the "toasty" quote in the pinball machine Medieval Madness. When the player hits the right ramp, one of the quotes that is played is "toasty!".

The "Toasty!" Easter egg is attributed in the dance simulator StepMania: whenever a player gets 250 consecutive Perfects or better (Excellents or better in the 4.0 CVS version), a "toasty" appears. The PopCap game Peggle also features a tribute, as does the Aerosmith-themed rail shooter Revolution X, where singer Steven Tyler shouts "Toasty!" in reaction to explosions.

Several songs that he composed for the Mortal Kombat 3 soundtrack were used in the precursor to South Park, Jesus vs. Santa.

Works

Pinball

Williams
 Black Knight 2000 (with Brian L. Schmidt and Steve Ritchie)
 Bad Cats
 RollerGames
 Riverboat Gambler (with Paul Heitsch)
 The Machine: Bride of Pin*Bot (with Jon Hey and Rich Karstens)
 The Getaway: High Speed II
 Star Trek: The Next Generation
 No Fear: Dangerous Sports
 Medieval Madness

Midway (Bally)
 Atlantis (with Robin Seaver)
 Mousin' Around!
 Harley Davidson
 The Party Zone
 The Pinball Circus
 The Shadow
 Attack From Mars
 Safecracker
 Revenge From Mars

Stern
 The Simpsons Pinball Party (with Chris Granner)

Video games

References

External links
 MobyGames' rap sheet on Forden
 
 
 Artist profile at OverClocked ReMix

1963 births
Internet memes
Living people
Musicians from Chicago
Pinball game designers
Video game composers